Being a Man Festival (BAM) is a UK-based festival which addresses the challenges and pressures of masculine identity in the 21st century. The festival was founded in 2014 by Jude Kelly.

BAM 2014 
Speakers at the inaugural festival included: Grayson Perry (artist), Ziauddin Yousafzai (father of the Nobel laureate Malala Yousafzai), Michael Kaufman (co-founder of the White Ribbon Campaign) Jon Snow (journalist), Billy Bragg (singer), Nick Hornby (writer and lyricist), Charlie Condou (actor) and Hardeep Singh Kohli (broadcaster and writer).

BAM 2015 
Speakers at the second festival included: Sheldon Thomas (imam and former extremist), Gemma Cairney (BBC Radio 1 presenter and documentary filmmaker), Akala (rapper) and Frankie Boyle (comedian).

BAM 2016 
Speakers at the 2016 festival included: Professor Green (rapper) and Roger Moore.

BAM 2017 
Speakers included: Simon Amstell (comedian), Robert Webb (comedian), Kevin Powell (American political activist), Alan Hollinghurst (writer and winner of the 2004 Booker Prize) and Antonythasan Jesuthasan (author and actor).

See also 
 Women of the World Festival

References

External links 
 Official web page at The Southbank Centre

Festivals in London
Gender and education
Masculinity
Masculism
Men
Men's events
Men's health
Men's movement
Men's rights
Festivals established in 2014